Regina Branner (5 September 1931 – 21 February 2017) was an Austrian athlete. She competed in the women's shot put at the 1956 Summer Olympics.

References

External links
 

1931 births
2017 deaths
Athletes (track and field) at the 1956 Summer Olympics
Austrian female shot putters
Olympic athletes of Austria
Place of birth missing